Swainsthorpe is a village in the English County of Norfolk in England. It lies on the A140 road, approximately 5 miles south of Norwich, and just north of Newton Flotman.
The village had two Churches, St.Peter's and St. Mary's, the latter is now in ruins.

The villages name means 'Sveinn's outlying farm/settlement'.

Facilities and amenities
St Peter's Church sits at the top of Church Road, the entrance to the village, and is one of 124 existing round-tower churches in Norfolk. It is part of the Tas Valley Team Ministry, alongside churches in Newton Flotman, Tasburgh, Tharston, Saxlingham and Shotesham. In 2012, an £80,000 project to re-order the nave and north aisle of the church, providing more space for community events, began.

Children of primary school age living in the village usually attend school in nearby Newton Flotman, while the nearest secondary school is Long Stratton High School.

The village has a public house, which was formerly known as "The Dun Cow", before reopening under a new management and a new name, "Sugarbeat", in July 2014.

Bus services operated by First Norfolk & Suffolk and Simonds of Botesdale, provide regular transport links to Norwich and Long Stratton.

Railway station
Swainsthorpe railway station on the Great Eastern Railway, which was the first station south of the Norwich terminus at Norwich Victoria railway station, was closed in 1952.

Level crossing incidents
At 13.05 on Sunday 13 November 2005, the 13.00 One Railways service from Norwich to Diss collided with a car, which according to witnesses, had positioned itself in the trains path. The driver was killed and the car burst into flames on impact. Nobody on board the train was killed. The level crossing was found to be in full working order.

At 6:22am on Thursday 1 March 2007, a One Railways service travelling from Colchester in Essex to Norwich, collided with a Vauxhall Astra on the crossing. One person in the car, believed to be the driver, died. The train, however, remained upright, did not derail and there were no injuries on board.

On 26 September 2013 a car hit the barrier at the level crossing, an incident which was witnessed by the driver of the Abellio Greater Anglia train. Nobody was injured.

Gallery

References

http://kepn.nottingham.ac.uk/map/place/Norfolk/Swainsthorpe

External links

 St Peter's on the European Round Tower Churches website

Villages in Norfolk
South Norfolk
Civil parishes in Norfolk